Anis Khedher (born 19 September 1991) is a Tunisian football midfielder who currently plays for Al-Entesar.

References

1991 births
Living people
Tunisian footballers
ES Zarzis players
AS Djerba players
LPS Tozeur players
ES Hammam-Sousse players
Olympique du Kef players
FC Hammamet players
Sfax Railways Sports players
AS Rejiche players
Qilwah FC players
Al-Entesar Club players
Association football midfielders
Tunisian Ligue Professionnelle 1 players
Saudi Second Division players
Tunisian expatriate sportspeople in Saudi Arabia
Expatriate footballers in Saudi Arabia